Herman Strategier (1912–1988) was a composer, organist, and conductor from The Netherlands. Strategier studied at the Roman Catholic School of Church Music in Utrecht. He served as conductor of Leiden's Dutch Madrigal Choir and also composed a number of larger concert works, among them are Don Ramiro (1943) for chorus and orchestra, Rembrandt Cantata (1956), and Shadow out of Time (1973) for ad libitum chorus, flute, percussion, organ, harp, and tape.

Selected works
  (Bell Music, 1972), for carillon
 Suite Felix (1978), for carillon

References

1912 births
1988 deaths
20th-century composers
20th-century conductors (music)
20th-century Dutch male musicians
20th-century organists
Composers for carillon
Dutch composers
Dutch conductors (music)
Dutch music educators
Dutch organists
Male conductors (music)
Male organists
People from Arnhem